Nicholas-Devon Thurman (born June 12, 1995) is an American football defensive end for the Jacksonville Jaguars of the National Football League (NFL). He played college football for Houston.

High school career 
Thurman played high school football at Lake Highlands High School. Thurman was a three star recruit coming out of high school and committed to the University of Houston to play football.

College football career 
Thurman played in 44 games in his career at Houston, recording 92 tackles, 15 tackles-for-loss, and 4.5 sacks. Thurman was named to the 2018 Senior Bowl watch list going into his senior season.

Professional career

Houston Texans
Thurman signed with the Houston Texans as an undrafted free agent on May 14, 2018. He was waived during final roster cuts on September 1, 2018.

Tampa Bay Buccaneers
Thurman signed with the Tampa Bay Buccaneers on April 4, 2019. He was waived on April 29, 2019.

New England Patriots 
On May 2, 2019, Thurman was signed by the New England Patriots. He was waived during final roster cuts on August 31, 2019, and signed to the team's practice squad the next day.

After spending the entire 2019 season on the practice squad, Thurman signed a reserve/futures contract with the Patriots on January 6, 2020. He was waived during final roster cuts on September 5, 2020, and signed to the practice squad the next day. He was elevated to the active roster on September 19, September 26, October 17, and October 24 for the team's weeks 2, 3, 6, and 7 games against the Seattle Seahawks, Las Vegas Raiders, Denver Broncos, and San Francisco 49ers; he reverted to the practice squad after each game. He made his NFL debut against the Seahawks. He was signed to the active roster on October 31. He was waived on November 14, 2020, and re-signed to the practice squad four days later. He was elevated to the active roster again on December 28 for the week 16 game against the Buffalo Bills, and reverted to the practice squad again following the game. He signed a reserve/future contract on January 4, 2021.

On August 31, 2021, Thurman was waived by the Patriots.

Atlanta Falcons 
On October 26, 2021, Thurman was signed to the Atlanta Falcons practice squad.  He signed a reserve/future contract with the Falcons on January 10, 2022.

On August 30, 2022, Thurman was waived by the Falcons.

Jacksonville Jaguars
On September 27, 2022, Thurman was signed to the Jacksonville Jaguars practice squad. He signed a reserve/future contract on January 23, 2023.

References

External links
New England Patriots bio

1995 births
Living people
Sportspeople from Texas
Players of American football from Texas
American football defensive tackles
Houston Texans players
Tampa Bay Buccaneers players
New England Patriots players
Atlanta Falcons players
Jacksonville Jaguars players